Cherifi is a surname of North African origin. Notable people with the surname include:

Sidi Amar Cherif (fl. 18th century), founder of Zawiyet Sidi Amar Cherif, zaouia school
Hacine Cherifi (born 1967), boxer
Lyes Cherifi (born 1968), judoka
Redouane Cherifi (born 1993), footballer

Surnames of African origin